For the Czech boxer with the same name see Jaroslav Konečný (boxer)

Jaroslav Konečný (14 January 1945 in Měnín – 1 August 2017 in Újezd u Brna) was a Czechoslovak handball player who competed in the 1972 Summer Olympics.

He was part of the Czechoslovak team which won the silver medal at the Munich Games. He played all six matches and scored 22 goals.

References

External links
 Profile at Sports-Reference.com

1945 births
2017 deaths
People from Brno-Country District
Czech male handball players
Czechoslovak male handball players
Olympic handball players of Czechoslovakia
Handball players at the 1972 Summer Olympics
Olympic silver medalists for Czechoslovakia
Olympic medalists in handball
Medalists at the 1972 Summer Olympics
Sportspeople from the South Moravian Region